Edeowie Station is a pastoral lease that currently operates as a sheep station in South Australia.

The property was established in 1859 by William Marchant who stocked it sheep. The Browne brothers had previously held the land as early as 1851. In the 1860s an eating house to service local travelers was built not far from the homestead. By 1863 the government had sunk a bore nearby and small township was established. Drought struck in 1865 and broke in 1868 but only after the population had been reduced at the small township from 316 to 36. A post office was built in 1870.

In 1920 the then owner, V. H. Mogg, sold the  station to Messrs H. L. Nutt and sons of Orroroo for £16,400.

See also
 List of ranches and stations
 Edeowie glass

References

Stations (Australian agriculture)
Pastoral leases in South Australia
Far North (South Australia)